The 2012 Tour de Romandie was the 66th running of the Tour de Romandie cycling stage race. It started on 24 April in Lausanne and ended on 29 April in Crans-Montana and consisted of six stages, including a race-commencing prologue stage and a race-concluding individual time trial. It was the 14th race of the 2012 UCI World Tour season.

Third place was taken by 's Rui Costa after he also put in a strong performance in the time trial, and gained sufficient time to move up from ninth overnight.

In the race's other classifications, Petr Ignatenko of  won both the green jersey for the most points gained in intermediate sprints, and the pink jersey for the King of the Mountains classification, while  finished at the head of the teams classification, with three of the squad's riders – Wiggins, Richie Porte and Michael Rogers – finishing in the overall top five.

Participating teams
As the Tour de Romandie was a UCI World Tour event, all 18 UCI ProTeams were invited automatically and obligated to send a squad. Two other squads were given wildcard places into the race, and as such, formed the event's 20-team peloton.

The 20 teams that competed in the race were:

Stages

Prologue
24 April 2012 — Lausanne, individual time trial (ITT)

The race began once again with a short prologue stage held in and around Lausanne; the stage returning to the city after the race visited Martigny for the prologue in the 2011 edition of the race. The stage itself,  in length, was relatively flat, dropping only  in altitude from the start, to the end. With rain expected to disrupt the stage, teams decided to spread their time trial specialists across the field in order to maximise their potential of winning the stage. For the first rider to depart the start in Lausanne, 's Maxime Méderel, weather conditions were dry. Mederel ultimately recorded a time of 3' 51" for the stage, but his time only held for a minute as 's Franck Bouyer completed the course 2.1 seconds quicker. Ramūnas Navardauskas improved upon Bouyer's time by almost ten seconds, recording a time one-hundredth inside 3' 40".

Clement's time held for a while, as riders struggled to match the pace that he had set; it was not until Giacomo Nizzolo, a rider regarded as a sprinter at the  team, recorded a time of 3' 34". Only one rider bettered his time for the course, and it was the rider that started immediately after him; Geraint Thomas set the fastest time of 3' 29", taking his team's fourteenth victory of the year, and his first since returning to the roads after a successful UCI Track World Championships, where he claimed a gold medal and a silver medal. Although he won the stage, Thomas' focus for the race was to support Mark Cavendish and Bradley Wiggins in their respective classifications.

Kristof Vandewalle was third for a time, recording a 3' 35" for the parcours, before his time was bettered by Michael Rogers and then Cavendish, who set his time just as the weather conditions changed; rain began to become a factor in the stage proceedings from then on. Overall contenders Tejay van Garderen, Jérôme Coppel, as well as Wiggins and van Garderen's team-mate Cadel Evans all finished outside the top ten after starting in the worst of the conditions; Wiggins placed best in eleventh, having again encountered wet conditions as he had done in the opening stage of March's Paris–Nice race.

Prologue Result and General Classification after Prologue

Stage 1
25 April 2012 — Morges to La Chaux-de-Fonds, 

With all the riders close together time-wise following the prologue stage,  were mainstays at the front of the peloton, trying to chip away at the advantage of the breakaway prior to the final finishing loop of  around La Chaux-de-Fonds. The quartet held an advantage of just under three-and-a-half minutes over the main field as the pack came across the line for the first time.

Over the next , the leaders' gap was cut to around a minute, prior to the second of the day's three categorised climbs, the second-category Haut de la Côte. Continued pressure at the head of the main field meant that riders were dislodged from the rear of pack, and those included prologue winner Geraint Thomas and Mark Cavendish. The breakaway was absorbed on the climb with Kohler trying to get clear but a counter-attack from Engoulvent's team-mate Fabrice Jeandesboz put him clear at the summit, although he was later brought back by the field.

Out front at this point was a seven-rider move representing six teams but could not sustain a meaningful gap ahead of the main field. Several mini-moves tried to get away with force after the descent from the climb, but  started to push forward in the pack, and helping out  with the pace-making and their protection of team leader Cadel Evans. Jeandesboz and Pierre Rolland were the last riders to attempt a move but were caught by the now-pacemaking  and  teams in the closing stages. The latter squad's Polish tandem Sylwester Szmyd and Maciej Paterski looked to gain distance at the front of the field ahead of the sprint, but an elongated move from Wiggins ultimately proved successful as the British national champion managed to hold off on the front, to take the leader's jersey on the line.

Stage 2
26 April 2012 — Montbéliard (France) to Moutier, 

Two riders – 's Christian Meier and  rider Lars Bak – went clear of the main field in the early running of the stage – beginning just over the Swiss-French border in the city of Montbéliard – and managed to extend their advantage to a maximum of almost four minutes at one stage of the parcours, slightly less than the advantage that was given to a breakaway quartet the previous day. Between them, Bak led across each of the three categorised climbs during the day – taking the pink jersey at the end of the stage, as the mountains classification leader – while Meier claimed the honours at the first of two intermediate sprints during the stage, coming after  in Delémont. Meier and Bak held their advantage at around three minutes with around  remaining.

On the La Caquerelle climb, Bak and Meier struggled off the front, with the climb reaching a gradient of 15% in places. Meier eventually cracked on the climb, leaving Bak on his own; at the summit, Bak led by just five seconds ahead of a two-man counter-attack from Fabrice Jeandesboz and 's Peter Stetina, and the peloton were eleven seconds further in arrears.

After passing Bak on the road, Jeandesboz and Stetina continued to step up the pace, putting both riders in contention to take the virtual race lead from 's Bradley Wiggins, having started the stage within 30 seconds of Wiggins in the general classification.

Stage 3
27 April 2012 — La Neuveville to Charmey, 

After going through the intermediate sprint at Bulle, Smukulis stepped up his pace and left his fellow breakaway riders behind him. With a gap of nearly 20 seconds over them, Smukulis tried to further the gap but was starting to lose some ground; indeed, Brammeier and van der Sande tried to kick away from Howard and Lund, but all four riders remained together behind Smukulis. After all bar Smukulis were caught outside of  remaining, Smukulis was brought back within the following kilometre. Further attacks from 's Fabrice Jeandesboz,  pair Roman Kreuziger and Janez Brajkovič, 's Simon Špilak as well as  rider Johnny Hoogerland were all thwarted quickly.

With their main sprinter Michael Matthews not in contention in the peloton,  put their sprint hopes in Luis León Sánchez, who had finished third into Moutier. Indeed, once Hoogerland had been caught within the final ,  had Richie Porte and Michael Rogers pace race leader Bradley Wiggins on the front of the field, with Sánchez in position in third wheel behind Rogers and Wiggins, after Porte had fallen back. Sánchez held his line to the far right of the road, pushing Meersman towards the barrier on the run-in, which left him frustrated; as he crossed the line behind Sánchez, in second place, he raised hand in protest at the finish. His team protested the sprint, but the race commissaires took no further action. Sánchez moved into second place overall behind Wiggins; a ten-second bonus for winning the stage reduced his deficit to Wiggins to just one second.

Stage 4
28 April 2012 — Bulle to Sion, 

After several unsuccessful attacks set the course of the early running – as the field remained as one – for much of the first half-hour of racing; it was not until the Col des Mosses that the stage's primary breakaway had been formed.

With Tschopp in such a prime position to Wiggins in the general classification, Wiggins' team was doing the lion's share of the work in the main field; a main field that was struggling to make headway due to the weather conditions. The headwinds did claim one victim as Tschopp's team-mate Tejay van Garderen was struck by a falling tree branch on the descent from the Col des Mosses. He received stitches for a wound on his nose, but was forced to abandon the race; he had been lying 17th overall in the general classification, trailing Wiggins by 15 seconds, and had been just four seconds behind countryman Andrew Talansky in the under-25 classification. As the breakaway reached the finish site in Sion for the first of two passings, their advantage was around the two-minute mark over the main field. The leaders split up after the second-category climb to Basse-Nendaz, as Tschopp, Ignatenko and Levarlet left the other three riders behind and set off to try and extend their ever-reducing advantage to the main pack.

A mini-group of around a dozen riders, including Wiggins, was prominent with around  remaining. It eventually came down to a final sprint to the line in Sion, where Luis León Sánchez took the stage victory for the second consecutive day, winning by a bike length. With ten seconds on offer to the winner as a bonus, Sánchez took the race leader's yellow jersey by nine seconds from Wiggins, ahead of the final stage time trial. Nocentini finished second on the stage, with 's Branislau Samoilau completing the podium.

Stage 5
29 April 2012 — Crans-Montana, individual time trial (ITT)

As was expected, the battle for the overall race victory came down to the final stage of the race; a technical  individual time trial in and around the ski resort of Crans-Montana. On the parcours was the first-category climb to Aminona, which would settle the destination of that particular jersey, coming around the midpoint of the stage. As was customary of time trial stages, cyclists set off in reverse order from where they were ranked in the general classification at the end of the previous stage. Pate recorded a time of 31' 20" for the course, but his team-mate Chris Froome bettered that time almost immediately, taking the benchmark through the 31-minute barrier, recording a time of 30' 41"; completing his first race on his return from a parasitic infection.

Larsson's time was soon bettered by team-mate Thomas De Gendt, who went eight seconds quicker than Larsson over the stage. De Gendt's time held to well inside the last forty riders to start the stage; with the top 37 riders in the general classification being separated by 48 seconds overnight.

Porte recorded a time of 29' 13", which was guaranteed to move him up from 32nd overall; his time was not beaten until 's Andrew Talansky went below 29 minutes – using a time-trial bike, unlike many other riders – with a time of 28' 57" to guarantee himself the victory in the young rider classification; so dominant was his performance, that he almost caught his rival for that competition, 's Wilco Kelderman, on the road, after Kelderman had started two minutes before him. Talansky's time was only beaten by one other rider;  rider Bradley Wiggins recovered from an early mechanical problem – caused by a dropped chain – to go quickest for the course, although his margin to Talansky was a marginal 0.7 seconds. The time was more than good enough to win the race overall, as Sánchez lost over a minute as last man on the road, which dropped him from the lead to tenth place in the final standings. Following his Paris–Nice win earlier in the year, Wiggins became the first rider to win both races in the same year since Dario Frigo in 2001.

Classification leadership table
In the 2012 Tour de Romandie, four different jerseys were awarded. For the general classification, calculated by adding each cyclist's finishing times on each stage, and allowing time bonuses in mass-start stages, the leader received a yellow jersey. This classification was considered the most important of the 2012 Tour de Romandie, and the winner of the classification was considered the winner of the race.

Additionally, there was a young rider classification, which awarded a white jersey. This was decided the same way as the general classification, but only riders born after 1 January 1987 were eligible to be ranked in the classification. There was also a mountains classification, the leadership of which was marked by a pink jersey. In the mountains classification, points were won by reaching the top of a climb before other cyclists, with more points available for the higher-categorised climbs.

The fourth jersey represented the sprints classification, marked by a green jersey. In the sprints classification, cyclists received points for finishing in the top 3 at intermediate sprint points during each stage, with the exception of the individual time trial stages. There was also a classification for teams, in which the times of the best three cyclists per team on each stage were added together; the leading team at the end of the race was the team with the lowest total time.

Notes

References

External links

 

Tour de Romandie
Tour de Romandie
2012 in Swiss sport